Illicium is a genus of flowering plants treated as part of the family Schisandraceae, or alternately as the sole genus of the Illiciaceae. It has a disjunct distribution, with most species native to eastern Asia and several in parts of North America, including the southeastern United States, Mexico, and the Caribbean. General common names include star anise and anisetree. The genus name comes from the Latin illicere ("to allure").

Description
Illicium species are evergreen shrubs and small trees. The leaves are alternately arranged and borne on petioles. The blades are glandular and fragrant. The flowers are solitary. They have few to many tepals in two or three rows, the inner ones like petals and the outer ones often smaller and more like bracts. A few to many stamens and pistils are at the center. The fruit is an aggregate of follicles arranged in a star-shaped whorl. One seed is in each follicle, released when the follicle dehisces. The seed has a thick, oily endosperm.

Biology
These are plants of moist understory, adapted to shady habitat, and some species are so sensitive to light that too much sunlight causes them significant stress, manifesting in chlorosis and necrosis of the leaves.

Uses
Several species are cultivated as ornamental plants for their flowers, foliage, and fragrance, leading to the development of several cultivars. Many taxa can only be grown in low-light situations.

The essential oils of several species are used as flavorings and carminatives; however, the oils of I. anisatum and I. floridanum are toxic. I. verum, the common star anise, is used to flavor food and liquor. Its fruit is a traditional Chinese medicine called bājiǎo huíxiāng, which is used to treat abdominal pain and vomiting.

Diversity
Illicium is a notably difficult genus to taxonomically classify. Many of the currently recognized species are lack distinguishing characters, and treatments tend to list many synonyms. Additionally, herbarium material is often poorly preserved or scarce.

Species include

References

Further reading
Carlquist, S. and E. L. Schneider. (2002). Vessels of Illicium (Illiciaceae): range of pit membrane remnant presence in perforations and other vessel details. International Journal of Plant Sciences 163(5), 755–63.
Williams, J. H. and W. E. Friedman. (2004). The four-celled female gametophyte of Illicium (Illiciaceae; Austrobaileyales): implications for understanding the origin and early evolution of monocots, eumagnoliids, and eudicots. American Journal of Botany 91(3), 332–51.

External links

Illicium species records. Flora of China.

 
Angiosperm genera